Leroy Louis Dietzel (January 9, 1931 – February 3, 2018) was an American professional baseball player who played nine Major League games in . He was born in Baltimore, Maryland.

In his debut, Dietzel started at second base and collected two hits with an RBI in four at bats, as the Senators defeated the Detroit Tigers, 16–6.

Overall, Dietzel went 5-for-21 in nine games, driving in one run and scoring one without extrabases. Afterwards, he returned to the minors for two more seasons before retiring in 1956.

Dietzel died in 2018 in Charlotte, North Carolina, at the age of 87.

References

External links

1931 births
2018 deaths
Baseball players from Baltimore
Charlotte Hornets (baseball) players
Chattanooga Lookouts players
Emporia Nationals players
Major League Baseball second basemen
Richmond Virginians (minor league) players
Scranton Miners players
Washington Senators (1901–1960) players